The Huxi Mosque is a mosque in Putuo District, Shanghai, China.

History
The mosque was originally constructed at Xikang Road in 1914-1921 and completed in 1922 under the name Yaoshuinong Mosque. In 1935, the mosque underwent renovation and was expanded to be able to accommodate 200 worshipers. The mosque resumed its religious activities in 1979. In April 1994, the mosque was moved to Changde Road.

Architecture

The mosque covers an area of 1,667 m2. The mosque consists of two-floor prayer hall. It is built with double arches and a fan-shaped roof. It also houses a teaching room, imam room, guesthouse and a bathhouse. It also features a butcher shop and a shop. The mosque consists of one minaret with a height of 25 meters and 6 domes.

Transportation
The mosque is accessible within walking distance north west of Changshou Road Station of Shanghai Metro.

See also
 Islam in China
 List of mosques in China

References

1922 establishments in China
Mosques completed in 1994
Mosques in Shanghai